El Kheiter is a town and commune in El Bayadh Province, Algeria.

References

Communes of El Bayadh Province